Thiago Kluzkovski de Almeida (born 23 February 1988) is a football player who plays for Goiânia Esporte Clube as defender.

Career

Thiago rode for several clubs before arriving at Atlético-GO 2010 to compete in the Campeonato Brasileiro.

Contract
 Atlético Goianiense.

References

External links
zerozerofootball.com

1988 births
Living people
Brazilian footballers
Association football defenders